North Sea Boats is an international boat building company specialized in building craft for military, law enforcement, SAR, commercial, and high performance applications. The company has presence in Sweden, Singapore and Indonesia, with its headquarters located at Banyuwangi, East Java, Indonesia. North Sea Boats was founded in 2003 by John and Lizza Lundin as a trading name for PT Lundin Industry Invest.

History

John Lundin grew up with boats, as his father Allan Lundin founded the Swedeship company which operated shipyards including Gotland shipyard and Djupvik Shipyard in Sweden. After the Swedish shipyard crisis the Swedeship company was the largest privately owned boat building company in Sweden. It was through Swedeship that John first came to Indonesia in the mid-1990s to investigate the company's expansion opportunities. Allan Lundin died from cancer in 1996, and Swedeship was sold. However John and his Indonesian wife Lizza moved there permanently. After some years of small-scale furniture manufacturing to gain experience of the business culture there, they founded the boat building company North Sea Boats in 2003.

Products
The boats are constructed using composite production techniques such as dual surface vacuum core resin infusion. All materials used are LLoyds / DNV Class Approved, and include carbon composite fibre and E Glass multi-axial non-woven stitched reinforcing and Vinyl Ester resins.

The various models incorporate "open architecture" deck plans that can be configured to perform multi-role tasks in a broad range of operational environments. They can be powered by inboard diesel engines, outboard motors or by transom drives and waterjets.

X3K 
A 63 meter long carbon composite stealth trimaran missile ship. The Indonesian Navy ordered the first of four for delivery starting in 2012.  The first of these was named KRI Klewang (hull number 625) and was launched on 29 August 2012; however, only four weeks later the ship caught fire on 28 September while undergoing fit-out in Bany uwangi, and was completely destroyed.

A replacement 63 m Trimaran is now under construction in Bany uwangi and is expected to be launched in early 2016. In the interim period, advances in infusable vinyl ester resin chemistry have seen the incorporation of nano particles into the resin. These particles aid the transfer of the resin through the carbon/glass fiber matrix and allow the use of fire retardant grade viny lester for infusion. This makes the carbon fiber composite structure of the new vessel self-extinguishing.

Bonefish USV 
Saab and PT Lundin (North Sea Boats) revealed a mockup of a trimaran Unmanned Surface Vessel (USV) at Indo Defence 2014.

It was formally unveiled by Indonesia's defense minister General (ret.) Ryamizard Ryacudu and Chief of Naval Staff Admiral Marsetio in a joint ribbon-cutting ceremony on the first day of the show.

Development of the Bonefish demonstrator began at the start of 2014, the concept marrying Saab Australia's mission systems integration expertise with a LOMOcean's trimaran hullform. The mockup was built in approximately six months at PT Lundin's composite boat production facility in Banyuwangi, East Java.

Capable of speeds of up to 40kts, Bonefish is designed to incorporate a wide range of sensors, satellite-based control and a modular payload bay to enable role flexibility. Potential missions could include anti-piracy, maritime surveillance, anti-submarine warfare, mine countermeasures, search and rescue, and hydrography.

X2K 
The 10.3 X2K Range and the 11.3 m X2K RHIB (Rigid Hull Inflatable Boat) Range of models incorporate a double stepped hull design that is based on an offshore race boat design from Sweden. It is a high performance model capable of speeds in excess of 50 knots.

There are several X2K variants in production, which include:
Sports / Fishing -  centre console recreational model
VIP Transfer - with an enclosed cabin for passenger transfers
Dive - configured for diving, or as a work boat.
Interceptor - designed for patrol and fast interception. 
Sports RHIB -  centre console recreational model
Special Forces / Operations RHIB -  serving military and law enforcement roles.
Interceptor RHIB - designed for patrol and fast interception.
SAR / Pilot / Work RHIB - configured for Search & Rescue, Pilot and work boat roles.

X10 RHIB 
The X10 is a 10.5 m RHIB model with a Deep "Vee" hull design. It is designed for patrol or commercial duty and can be fitted with either inboard diesel engines and waterjets, conventional stern drives, or outboard motors.

X38 Catamaran 
The X38 is a 12.3 m, stepped-hull, power catamaran design for passenger transfers, diving, conservation, patrol, and combat operations. It can also be used for law enforcement, medical evacuations and rescue operations.

Tank Boat 
The X18 Tank Boat is a catamaran design for coastal and riverine environments. It has a crew of 6, and will also carry a High-speed Interdiction RIB for boarding and SEAL insertion. The main weapon system of the X18 Tank Boat is the CMI Defense Cockerill 3105. The 105 mm gun is also capable of firing the Cockerill Falarick 105 Gun Launched Anti-Tank Guided Missile (GLATGM). It can be augmented with a Bofors LEMUR Remote Weapons Systems incorporating 7.62 – 30 mm GPMG/ Cannon. In April 2021, a working prototype underwent testing. The prototype however uses 30 mm cannon as its main gun.

Carbotech GT38

References

Boat builders
Defense companies of Indonesia
Shipbuilding companies of Indonesia